Anthony Michael Bourdain (June 25, 1956 – June 8, 2018) was an American celebrity chef, author, and travel documentarian who starred in programs focusing on the exploration of international culture, cuisine, and the human condition. Bourdain was a 1978 graduate of The Culinary Institute of America and a veteran of many professional kitchens during his career, which included several years spent as an executive chef at Brasserie Les Halles in Manhattan. He first became known for his bestselling book Kitchen Confidential: Adventures in the Culinary Underbelly (2000).

Bourdain's first food and world-travel television show A Cook's Tour ran for 35 episodes on the Food Network in 2002 and 2003. In 2005, he began hosting the Travel Channel's culinary and cultural adventure programs Anthony Bourdain: No Reservations (2005–2012) and The Layover (2011–2013). In 2013, he began a three-season run as a judge on The Taste and consequently switched his travelogue programming to CNN to host Anthony Bourdain: Parts Unknown. Although best known for his culinary writings and television presentations, along with several books on food and cooking and travel adventures, Bourdain also wrote both fiction and historical nonfiction. On June 8, 2018, Bourdain killed himself while on location in France, filming for Parts Unknown.

Early life
Anthony Michael Bourdain was born in Manhattan on June 25, 1956. His mother was Gladys (née Sacksman), and his father was Pierre Bourdain (1929–1987). His younger brother, Christopher, was born a few years later. Anthony grew up living with both of his parents and described his childhood in one of his books: "I did not want for love or attention. My parents loved me. Neither of them drank to excess. Nobody beat me. God was never mentioned so I was annoyed by neither church nor any notion of sin or damnation." His father was Catholic and his mother Jewish. Bourdain stated that, although he was considered Jewish by halacha's definition, "I've never been in a synagogue. I don't believe in a higher power. But that doesn't make me any less Jewish I don't think." His family was not religious either. At the time of Bourdain's birth, Pierre was a salesman at a New York City camera store, as well as a floor manager at a record store. He later became an executive for Columbia Records, and Gladys was a staff editor at The New York Times.

Bourdain's paternal grandparents were French (his great grandfather Aurélien Bourdain was born in Brazil to French parents); his paternal grandfather Pierre Michel Bourdain (1905-1932) emigrated from Arcachon to New York following World War I. Bourdain's father spent summers in France as a boy and grew up speaking French. Bourdain spent most of his childhood in Leonia, New Jersey. He felt jealous of the lack of parental supervision of his classmates and the freedom they had in their homes. In his youth, Bourdain was a member of the Boy Scouts of America.

Culinary training and career
Bourdain's love of food was kindled in his youth while on a family vacation in France when he tried his first oyster from a fisherman's boat. He graduated from the Dwight-Englewood School—an independent coeducational college-preparatory day school in Englewood, New Jersey—in 1973, then enrolled at Vassar College but dropped out after two years. He worked at seafood restaurants in Provincetown, Massachusetts, including the Lobster Pot (restaurant), while attending Vassar, which inspired his decision to pursue cooking as a career.

Bourdain attended The Culinary Institute of America, graduating in 1978. From there he went on to run various restaurant kitchens in New York City, including the Supper Club, One Fifth Avenue and Sullivan's.

In 1998, Bourdain became an executive chef at Brasserie Les Halles. Based in Manhattan, at the time the brand had additional restaurants in Miami, Washington, D.C. and Tokyo. Bourdain remained an executive chef there for many years and even when no longer formally employed at Les Halles, he maintained a relationship with the restaurant, which described him in January 2014 as their "chef at large". Les Halles closed in 2017 after filing for bankruptcy.

Media career

Writing
In the mid-1980s, Bourdain began submitting unsolicited work for publication to Between C & D, a literary magazine of the Lower East Side. The magazine eventually published a piece that Bourdain had written about a chef who was trying to purchase heroin in the Lower East Side. In 1985, Bourdain signed up for a writing workshop with Gordon Lish. In 1990, Bourdain received a small book advance from Random House, after meeting a Random House editor.

His first book, a culinary mystery called Bone in the Throat, was published in 1995. He paid for his own book tour, but he did not find success. His second mystery book, Gone Bamboo, also performed poorly in sales.

Kitchen Confidential: Adventures in the Culinary Underbelly

Kitchen Confidential: Adventures in the Culinary Underbelly, a 2000 New York Times bestseller, was an expansion of his 1999 New Yorker article "Don't Eat Before Reading This".

Medium Raw: A Bloody Valentine to the World of Food and the People Who Cook

In 2010, he published Medium Raw: A Bloody Valentine to the World of Food and the People Who Cook, a memoir and follow-up to the book Kitchen Confidential.

A Cook's Tour

He wrote two more bestselling nonfiction books: A Cook's Tour: Global Adventures in Extreme Cuisines (2001), an account of his food and travel exploits around the world, written in conjunction with his first television series of the same title.

The Nasty Bits
  

In 2006, Bourdain published The Nasty Bits, a collection of 37 exotic, provocative, and humorous anecdotes and essays, many of them centered around food, and organized into sections named for each of the five traditional flavors, followed by a 30-page fiction piece ("A Chef's Christmas").

Typhoid Mary: An Urban Historical

Bourdain published a hypothetical historical investigation, Typhoid Mary: An Urban Historical, about Mary Mallon, an Irish-born cook believed to have infected 53 people with typhoid fever between 1907 and 1938.

No Reservations: Around the World on an Empty Stomach

In 2007, Bourdain published No Reservations: Around the World on an Empty Stomach, covering the experiences of filming and photographs of the three first seasons of the show and his crew at work while filming the series.

His articles and essays appeared in many publications, including in The New Yorker, The New York Times, The Times of the Los Angeles Times, The Observer, Gourmet, Maxim, and Esquire. Scotland on Sunday, The Face, Food Arts, Limb by Limb, BlackBook, The Independent, Best Life, the Financial Times, and Town & Country. His blog for the third season of Top Chef was nominated for a Webby Award for Best Blog (in the Cultural/Personal category) in 2008.

In 2012, Bourdain co-wrote the graphic novel Get Jiro! with Joel Rose, with art by Langdon Foss.

In 2015, Bourdain joined the travel, food, and politics publication Roads & Kingdoms, as the site's sole investor and editor-at-large. Over the next several years, Bourdain contributed to the site and edited the Dispatched By Bourdain series. Bourdain and Roads & Kingdoms also partnered on the digital series Explore Parts Unknown, which launched in 2017 and won a Primetime Emmy Award for Outstanding Short Form Nonfiction or Reality Series in 2018.

Television

As series host

Bourdain hosted many food and travel series, including his first show, A Cook's Tour (2002 to 2003). He worked for The Travel Channel from 2005 to 2013. He also worked for CNN from 2013 to 2018. Bourdain described the concept as, "I travel around the world, eat a lot of shit, and basically do whatever the fuck I want". Nigella Lawson noted that Bourdain had an "incredibly beautiful style when he talks that ranges from erudite to brilliantly slangy".

A Cook's Tour (2002–2003)

The acclaim surrounding Bourdain's memoir Kitchen Confidential led to an offer by the Food Network for him to host his own food and world-travel show, A Cook's Tour, which premiered in January 2002. It ran for 35 episodes, through 2003.

No Reservations (2005–2012)

In July 2005, he premiered a new, somewhat similar television series, Anthony Bourdain: No Reservations, on the Travel Channel. As a further result of the immense popularity of Kitchen Confidential, the Fox sitcom Kitchen Confidential aired in 2005, in which the character Jack Bourdain is based loosely on Anthony Bourdain's biography and persona.

In July 2006, he and his crew were in Beirut filming an episode of No Reservations when the Israel-Lebanon conflict broke out unexpectedly after the crew had filmed only a few hours of footage. His producers compiled behind-the-scenes footage of him and his production staff, including not only their initial attempts to film the episode, but also their firsthand encounters with Hezbollah supporters, their days of waiting for news with other expatriates in a Beirut hotel, and their eventual escape aided by a fixer (unseen in the footage), whom Bourdain dubbed Mr. Wolf after Harvey Keitel's character in Pulp Fiction. Bourdain and his crew were finally evacuated with other American citizens, on the morning of July 20, by the United States Marine Corps. The Beirut No Reservations episode, which aired on August 21, 2006, was nominated for an Emmy Award in 2007.

The Layover (2011–2013)

In July 2011, the Travel Channel announced adding a second one-hour, 10-episode Bourdain show to be titled The Layover, which premiered November 21, 2011. Each episode featured an exploration of a city that can be undertaken within an air travel layover of 24 to 48 hours. The series ran for 20 episodes, through February 2013. Bourdain executive produced a similar show hosted by celebrities called The Getaway, which lasted two seasons on Esquire Network.

Parts Unknown (2013–2018)

In May 2012, Bourdain announced that he was leaving the Travel Channel. In December, he explained on his blog that his departure was due to his frustration with the channel's new ownership using his voice and image to make it seem as if he were endorsing a car brand, and the channel's creating three "special episodes" consisting solely of clips from the seven official episodes of that season. He went on to host Anthony Bourdain: Parts Unknown for CNN. The program focused on other cuisines, cultures and politics and premiered on April 14, 2013.

President Barack Obama was featured on the program in an episode filmed in Vietnam that aired in September 2016; the two talked over a beer and bun cha at a small restaurant in Hanoi. The show was filmed and is set in places as diverse as Libya, Tokyo, the Punjab region, Jamaica, Turkey, Ethiopia, Nigeria, Far West Texas and Armenia.

The Mind of a Chef

Between 2012 and 2017, he served as narrator and executive producer for several episodes of the award-winning PBS series The Mind of a Chef; it aired on the last months of each year. The series moved from PBS to Facebook Watch in 2017.

Appearances as judge, mentor and guest

The Taste

From 2013 to 2015 he was an executive producer and appeared as a judge and mentor in ABC's cooking-competition show The Taste. He earned an Emmy nomination for each season.

Top Chef
  

Bourdain appeared five times as guest judge on Bravo's Top Chef reality cooking competition program.

His first appearance was in "Thanksgiving" recorded in November 2006 episode of Season 2.

His second appearance was in the first episode of Season 3 in June 2007 judging the "exotic surf and turf" competition that featured ingredients including abalone, alligator, black chicken, geoduck and eel.

His third appearance was also in Season 3, as an expert on air travel, judging the competitors' airplane meals. He also wrote weekly blog commentaries for many of the Season 3 episodes, filling in as a guest blogger while Top Chef judge Tom Colicchio was busy opening a new restaurant.

He next appeared as a guest judge for the opening episode of Season 4, in which pairs of chefs competed head-to-head in the preparation of various classic dishes, and again in the Season 4 Restaurant Wars episode, temporarily taking the place of head judge Tom Colicchio, who was at a charity event. He appeared as a guest judge in episode 12 of Top Chef: D.C. (Season 7), where he judged the cheftestants' meals they made for NASA.

He was also one of the main judges on Top Chef All-Stars (Top Chef, Season 8).

He made a guest appearance on the August 6, 2007 New York City episode of Bizarre Foods with Andrew Zimmern, and Zimmern himself appeared as a guest on the New York City episode of Bourdain's No Reservations airing the same day. On October 20, 2008, Bourdain hosted a special, At the Table with Anthony Bourdain, on the Travel Channel.

Miami Ink
Bourdain appeared in an episode of TLC's reality show Miami Ink, aired on August 28, 2006, in which artist Chris Garver tattooed a skull on his right shoulder. Bourdain, who noted it was his fourth tattoo, said that one reason for the skull was that he wished to balance the ouroboros tattoo he had inked on his opposite shoulder in Malaysia, while filming Anthony Bourdain: No Reservations.

Other appearances
Bourdain was a consultant and writer for the television series Treme.

In 2010, he appeared on Nick Jr.'s Yo Gabba Gabba! as Dr. Tony, part of which was included in the movie Roadrunner.

In 2011, he voiced himself in a cameo on an episode of The Simpsons titled "The Food Wife", in which Marge, Lisa, and Bart start a food blog called The Three Mouthkateers.

He appeared in a 2013 episode of the animated series Archer (S04E07), voicing chef Lance Casteau, a parody of himself. In 2015, he voiced a fictionalized version of himself on an episode of Sanjay and Craig titled "Snake Parts Unknown".

From 2015 to 2017, Bourdain hosted Raw Craft, a series of short videos released on YouTube. The series followed Bourdain as he visited various artisans who produce various craft items by hand, including iron skillets, suits, saxophones, and kitchen knives. The series was produced by William Grant & Sons to promote their Balvenie distillery's products.

Publishing
In September 2011, Ecco Press announced that Bourdain would have his own publishing line, Anthony Bourdain Books, which included acquiring between three and five titles per year that "reflect his remarkably eclectic tastes". The first books that the imprint published, released in 2013, include L.A. Son: My Life, My City, My Food by Roy Choi, Tien Nguyen, and Natasha Phan, Prophets of Smoked Meat by Daniel Vaughn, and Pain Don't Hurt by Mark Miller. Bourdain also announced plans to publish a book by Marilyn Hagerty.

Discern nothing from this initial list—other than a general affection for people who cook food and like food. The ability to kick people in the head is just as compelling to us—as long as that's coupled with an ability to vividly describe the experience. We are just as intent on crossing genres as we are enthusiastic about our first three authors. It only gets weirder from here."

Shortly after Bourdain's death, HarperCollins announced that the publishing line would be shut down after the remaining works under contract were published.

Film
Bourdain appeared as himself in the 2015 film The Big Short, in which he used seafood stew as an analogy for a collateralized debt obligation. He also produced and starred in Wasted! The Story of Food Waste.

Public persona

Drew Magary, in a column for GQ published on the day of Bourdain's death, reflected that Bourdain was heir in spirit to Hunter S. Thompson. Smithsonian magazine declared Bourdain "the original rock star" of the culinary world, while his public persona was characterized by Gothamist as "culinary bad boy". Due to his liberal use of profanity and sexual references in his television show No Reservations, the network added viewer-discretion advisories to each episode.

Bourdain was known for consuming exotic local specialty dishes, having eaten black-colored blood sausages called  (lit. "black sausage") in Finland and also "sheep testicles in Morocco, ant eggs in Puebla, Mexico, a raw seal eyeball as part of a traditional Inuit seal hunt, and an entire cobra—beating heart, blood, bile, and meat—in Vietnam". Bourdain was quoted as saying that a Chicken McNugget was the most disgusting thing he ever ate, but he was fond of Popeyes chicken. He also declared that the unwashed warthog rectum he ate in Namibia was "the worst meal of [his] life", along with the fermented shark he ate in Iceland.

Bourdain was noted for his put-downs of celebrity chefs, such as Paula Deen, Bobby Flay, Guy Fieri, Sandra Lee, and Rachael Ray, and appeared irritated by both the overt commercialism of the celebrity cooking industry and its lack of culinary authenticity. He voiced a "serious disdain for food demigods like Alan Richman, Alice Waters, and Alain Ducasse." Bourdain recognized the irony of his transformation into a celebrity chef and began to qualify his insults; in the 2007 New Orleans episode of No Reservations, he reconciled with Emeril Lagasse, whom he had previously disparaged in Kitchen Confidential. He later wrote more favourably of Lagasse in the preface of the 2013 edition. He was outspoken in his praise for chefs he admired, particularly Ferran Adrià, Juan Mari Arzak, Fergus Henderson, José Andrés, Thomas Keller, Martin Picard, Éric Ripert, and Marco Pierre White, as well as his former protégé and colleagues at Brasserie Les Halles. He spoke very highly of Julia Child's influence on him.

Bourdain was known for his sarcastic comments about vegan and vegetarian activists, considering their lifestyle "rude" to the inhabitants of many countries he visited. He considered vegetarianism, except in the case of religious exemptions, a "First World luxury". However, he also believed that Americans eat too much meat, and admired vegetarians and vegans who put aside their beliefs when visiting different cultures in order to be respectful of their hosts.

Bourdain's book The Nasty Bits is dedicated to "Joey, Johnny, and Dee Dee" of the Ramones. He declared fond appreciation for their music, as well that of other early punk bands such as Dead Boys and The Voidoids. He said that the playing of music by Billy Joel, Elton John, or the Grateful Dead in his kitchen was grounds for firing. Joel was a fan of Bourdain's, and visited the restaurant.

On No Reservations and Parts Unknown, he dined with and interviewed many musicians, both in the U.S. and elsewhere, with a special focus on glam and punk rockers such as Alice Cooper, David Johansen, Marky Ramone and Iggy Pop. He featured contemporary band Queens of the Stone Age on No Reservations several times, and they composed and performed the theme song for Parts Unknown.

Personal life 
In the 1970s, while attending high school at Dwight-Englewood School, Bourdain dated Nancy Putkoski. He described her as "a bad girl", older than him and "part of a druggy crowd". She was a year above him, and Bourdain graduated one year early in order to follow Putkoski to Vassar College since they had just started admitting men. He studied there between the ages of 17 and 19. He then attended the Culinary Institute of America, a 15-minute drive from Vassar. The couple married in 1985, and remained together for two decades, divorcing in 2005.

On April 20, 2007, he married Ottavia Busia, who later became a mixed martial artist. The couple's daughter, Ariane, was born in 2007. Bourdain said having to be away from his family for 250 days a year working on his television shows put strain on the relationship. Busia appeared in several episodes of No Reservations, notably the ones in Tuscany, Rome, Rio de Janeiro, Naples, and her birthplace of Sardinia. The couple separated in 2016.

Bourdain met Italian actress Asia Argento in 2016 while filming the Rome episode of Parts Unknown. In October 2017, Argento told in an article of the New Yorker that she had been sexually assaulted by Harvey Weinstein in the 1990s. After being criticised for her account in Italian media and politics, Argento moved to Germany to escape what she described as a culture of "victim blaming" in Italy. Argento delivered a speech on May 20, 2018, following the 2018 Cannes Film Festival, calling the festival Weinstein's "hunting ground", alleging that she was raped by Weinstein in Cannes when she was 21. She added, "And even tonight, sitting among you, there are those who still have to be held accountable for their conduct against women." Bourdain supported her during that period. On June 3, 2018, Bourdain tweeted a video where the team was celebrating during the production of the show with Argento as director, him and Chris Doyle. In August 2018, it emerged that Bourdain paid actor Jimmy Bennett a $380,000 settlement in October 2017 for his silence, so that Argento could avoid negative publicity for allegedly sexually assaulting Bennett in 2013, when he was 17 and Argento was 37.

Bourdain practiced the martial art Brazilian jiu-jitsu, earning a blue belt in August 2015. He won gold at the IBJJF New York Spring International Open Championship in 2016, in the Middleweight Master 5 (age 51 and older) division.

Bourdain was known to be a heavy smoker. In a nod to Bourdain's two-pack-a-day cigarette habit, Thomas Keller once served him a 20-course tasting menu which included a mid-meal "coffee and cigarette", a coffee custard infused with tobacco, with a foie gras mousse. Bourdain stopped smoking in 2007 for his daughter, but restarted towards the end of his life.

A former user of cocaine, heroin, and LSD, Bourdain wrote in Kitchen Confidential of his experience in a SoHo restaurant in 1981, where he and his friends were often high. Bourdain said drugs influenced his decisions, and that he would send a busboy to Alphabet City to obtain cannabis, methaqualone, cocaine, LSD, psilocybin mushrooms, secobarbital, tuinal, amphetamine, codeine, and heroin.

Death

In early June 2018, Bourdain was working on an episode of Parts Unknown in Strasbourg, with his frequent collaborator and friend Éric Ripert. On June 8, Ripert became worried when Bourdain had missed dinner and breakfast. He subsequently found Bourdain dead of an apparent suicide by hanging in his room at Le Chambard hotel in Kaysersberg near Colmar.

Bourdain's body bore no signs of violence and the suicide appeared to be an impulsive act. Rocquigny du Fayel disclosed that Bourdain's toxicology results were negative for narcotics, showing only a trace of a therapeutic non-narcotic medication. Bourdain's body was cremated in France on June 13, 2018, and his ashes were returned to the United States two days later.

Reactions and tributes 

Bourdain's mother, Gladys Bourdain, told The New York Times: "He is absolutely the last person in the world I would have ever dreamed would do something like this."

Following the news of Bourdain's death, various celebrity chefs and other public figures expressed sentiments of condolence. Among them were fellow chefs Andrew Zimmern and Gordon Ramsay, former astronaut Scott Kelly, and then-U.S. president Donald Trump. CNN issued a statement, saying that Bourdain's "talents never ceased to amaze us and we will miss him very much." Former U.S. president Barack Obama, who dined with Bourdain in Vietnam on an episode of Parts Unknown, wrote on Twitter: "He taught us about food—but more importantly, about its ability to bring us together. To make us a little less afraid of the unknown." On the day of Bourdain's death, CNN aired Remembering Anthony Bourdain, a tribute program.

In the days following Bourdain's death, fans paid tribute to him outside his now-closed former place of employment, Brasserie Les Halles. Cooks and restaurant owners gathered together and held tribute dinners and memorials and donated net sales to the National Suicide Prevention Lifeline.

In August 2018, CNN announced a final, posthumous season of Parts Unknown, completing its remaining episodes using narration and additional interviews from featured guests, and two retrospective episodes paying tribute to the series and Bourdain's legacy.

In June 2019, Éric Ripert and José Andrés announced the first Bourdain Day as a tribute to Bourdain. In the same month, the Culinary Institute of America (CIA) established a scholarship in Bourdain's honor.

A collection of Bourdain's personal items were sold at auction in October 2019, raising $1.8 million, part of which is to support the Anthony Bourdain Legacy Scholarship at his alma mater, the Culinary Institute of America. The most expensive item sold was his custom Bob Kramer Steel and Meteorite Chef's knife, selling at a record $231,250.

In June 2021, a documentary film directed by Morgan Neville and produced by CNN Films and HBO Max titled Roadrunner: A Film About Anthony Bourdain, had its world premiere at the Tribeca Film Festival. It was released by Focus Features on July 16, 2021.

In October 2022, Down and Out in Paradise: The Life of Anthony Bourdain, an unauthorized biography of Bourdain, was published.

Interests and advocacy 
In an assessment of Bourdain's life for The Nation, David Klion wrote that, "Bourdain understood that the point of journalism is to tell the truth, to challenge the powerful, to expose wrongdoing. But his unique gift was to make doing all that look fun rather than grim or tedious." According to Klion, Bourdain's shows "made it possible to believe that social justice and earthly delights weren't mutually exclusive, and he pursued both with the same earnest reverence."

Bourdain advocated for communicating the value of traditional or peasant foods, including all of the varietal bits and unused animal parts not usually eaten by affluent, 21st-century Americans. He also praised the quality of freshly prepared street food in other countries—especially developing countries—compared to fast-food chains in the U.S. Regarding Western moral criticism of cuisine in developing countries, Bourdain stated: "Let's call this criticism what it is: racism. There are a lot of practices from the developing world that I find personally repellent, from my privileged Western point of view. But I don't feel like I have such a moral high ground that I can walk around lecturing people in developing nations on how they should live their lives."

With regard to criticism of the Chinese, Bourdain stated: "The way in which people dismiss whole centuries-old cultures—often older than their own and usually non-white—with just utter contempt aggravates me. People who suggest I shouldn't go to a country like China, look at or film it, because some people eat dog there, I find that racist, frankly. Understand people first: their economic, living situation." Regarding the myth that monosodium glutamate in Chinese food is unhealthy, Bourdain said: "It's a lie. You know what causes Chinese restaurant syndrome? Racism. 'Ooh I have a headache; it must have been the Chinese guy.'"

In an acceptance speech for an award given by the Muslim Public Affairs Council, Bourdain stated, "The world has visited many terrible things on the Palestinian people, none more shameful than robbing them of their basic humanity." He opened the episode of Parts Unknown on Jerusalem with the prediction that "By the end of this hour, I'll be seen by many as a terrorist sympathizer, a Zionist tool, a self-hating Jew, an apologist for American imperialism, an Orientalist, socialist, a fascist, CIA agent, and worse."

He championed industrious Spanish-speaking immigrants—from Mexico, Ecuador, and other Central and South American countries—who are cooks and chefs in many United States restaurants, including upscale establishments, regardless of cuisine. He considered them talented chefs and invaluable cooks, underpaid and unrecognized even though they have become the backbone of the U.S. restaurant industry.

In 2017, Bourdain became a vocal advocate against sexual harassment in the restaurant industry, speaking out about celebrity chefs Mario Batali and John Besh, and in Hollywood, particularly following his then girlfriend Asia Argento's sexual abuse allegations against Harvey Weinstein. Bourdain accused Hollywood director Quentin Tarantino of "complicity" in the Weinstein sex scandal.

Following the death of Elizabeth II, a 2018 video resurfaced on Twitter showing Bourdain refusing to complete a toast to the Queen, saying "I hate the aristocracy".

Awards and nominations
 Bourdain was named Food Writer of the Year in 2001 by Bon Appétit magazine for Kitchen Confidential.
 A Cook's Tour: In Search of the Perfect Meal was named Food Book of the Year in 2002 by the British Guild of Food Writers.
 The Beirut episode of Anthony Bourdain: No Reservations, which documented the experiences of Bourdain and his crew during the 2006 Israel-Lebanon conflict, was nominated for an Emmy Award for Outstanding Informational Programming in 2007.
 Bourdain's blog for the reality competition show Top Chef was nominated for a Webby Award for best Blog – Culture/Personal in 2008.
 In 2008, Bourdain was inducted into the James Beard Foundation's Who's Who of Food and Beverage in America.
 In 2009 and 2011, Anthony Bourdain: No Reservations won a Creative Arts Emmy Award for Outstanding Cinematography for Nonfiction Programming.
 In 2010, Bourdain was nominated for a Creative Arts Emmy for Outstanding Writing for Nonfiction Programming.
 In 2012, Bourdain was awarded an Honorary Clio Award, which is given to individuals who are changing the world by encouraging people to think differently.
 In 2012, Anthony Bourdain: No Reservations won the Critics' Choice Best Reality Series award.
 In 2013, 2014 and 2015, Bourdain was nominated for the Primetime Emmy Award for Outstanding Host for a Reality or Reality-Competition Program for The Taste.
 Each year from 2013 to 2016 & 2018, Bourdain won the Emmy Award for Outstanding Informational Series or Special for Anthony Bourdain: Parts Unknown.
 In 2014, the 2013 season of Anthony Bourdain: Parts Unknown won a Peabody Award, which was accepted by Bourdain.
 In December 2017, the Culinary Institute of America (CIA) conferred the honorary degree of Doctor of Humane Letters in Culinary Arts honoris causa to Bourdain, who graduated from the CIA with an associate degree in 1978. 
Bourdain posthumously won a 2018 Primetime Emmy Award for Outstanding Short Form Nonfiction or Reality Series in partnership with Roads & Kingdoms.

Books

Nonfiction

Fiction

Citations

General and cited sources

Further reading 
   Unauthorized biography.

External links

 Anthony Bourdain: Parts Unknown
 Anthony Bourdain: No Reservations
 Bourdain's biography on TravelChannel.com
 
 
 Anthony Bourdain at the Chef and Restaurant Database

1956 births
2018 deaths
2018 suicides
20th-century American male writers
20th-century American non-fiction writers
20th-century American novelists
20th-century essayists
21st-century American Jews
21st-century American male writers
21st-century American non-fiction writers
21st-century American novelists
21st-century essayists
American book publishers (people)
American crime fiction writers
American food writers
American graphic novelists
American male chefs
American male essayists
American male novelists
American memoirists
American people of French descent
American practitioners of Brazilian jiu-jitsu
American television chefs
Chefs from New York (state)
Chefs from New York City
Chefs of French cuisine
CNN people
Culinary Institute of America Hyde Park alumni
Dwight-Englewood School alumni
Food Network chefs
Jewish American chefs
Jewish American writers
Novelists from New York (state)
Participants in American reality television series
People from Leonia, New Jersey
People with mood disorders
Primetime Emmy Award winners
Suicides by hanging in France
Television producers from New Jersey
Television producers from New York City
Vassar College alumni
Writers from New York City
American gastronomes